Go Insane is the second solo studio album by American rock musician Lindsey Buckingham, then the lead guitarist and male lead vocalist of Fleetwood Mac. The album was released on July 30, 1984 by Elektra Records and Warner Music Group, while Fleetwood Mac was on a hiatus between albums. It peaked at No. 45 on the U.S. Billboard 200 chart. Two promotional music videos were shot for the album. These include "Go Insane" and "Slow Dancing".

The album was dedicated to Buckingham's former girlfriend, Carol Ann Harris, with whom he had just ended a relationship.

Content
"Slow Dancing" and the title track were lifted from the album as singles. The latter became Buckingham's second top 40 hit in the US. "D.W. Suite" was written for Dennis Wilson of the Beach Boys, who had died the December before the album was released. "Play in the Rain" is a seven minute song split into two parts: one on the end of the first side and one on the beginning of the second side. On the vinyl version, there is a "locked groove" at the end of side one on the song "Play in the Rain." This allowed the closing section of the song to play through the lead-out groove until the needle reaches the continuous groove near the label of the record.

Unlike Buckingham's previous studio album Law and Order, Go Insane did not include any acoustic drumming. Instead, he programmed the drums on a LinnDrum drum machine and Fairlight CMI sampling synthesizer. The latter instrument was acquired by Buckingham right before the making of Go Insane. Buckingham played all of the instruments on the album except for on "I Want You" and "Go Insane."

Release

Go Insane was released on July 30, 1984, and entered Billboards U.S. album chart on September 1, reaching No. 45. The album has received positive reviews.

Track listing

PersonnelMusicians Lindsey Buckingham – vocals, guitars, bass, keyboards, Fairlight CMI, pump organ (8), LinnDrum, percussion, lap harp (9)
 Gordon Fordyce – keyboards (1), cowbell (1), howling (5)
 Bryant Simpson – bass (2)Production and artwork'
 Roy Thomas Baker – executive producer 
 Lindsey Buckingham – producer, recording 
 Gordon Fordyce – producer, recording 
 John Boghosian – recording assistant 
 George Marino – mastering 
 Sterling Sound (New York City, New York) – mastering location 
 Vigon Seireeni – art direction 
 Matthew Rolston – photography 
 Michael Brokaw – management

References

External links
 

Lindsey Buckingham albums
1984 albums
Albums produced by Lindsey Buckingham
Reprise Records albums
Warner Music Group albums